Ferranti is an Italian surname. Notable people with the surname include:

Ferrante Ferranti (born 1960), French photographer and architect
Gina Ferranti, American actress
Marie Ferranti, French writer
Marco Aurelio Zani de Ferranti
Vincent Ziani de Ferranti
Sebastian Ziani de Ferranti

See also
Ferranti
Ferrante

Italian-language surnames